Following are the results of the 1999 Australian Open girls' singles.  The 1999 Australian Open was a tennis tournament played on outdoor hard courts at Melbourne Park in Melbourne in Victoria in Australia. It was the 87th edition of the Australian Open and was held from 18 through 31 January 1999. This was the first Grand Slam of the calendar year.

Jelena Kostanić was the defending champion, but did not compete in 1999.French thirteenth seed Virginie Razzano won the title, defeating Slovakian ninth seed Katarína Bašternáková in the final, 6–1, 6–1.

Seeds

Draw

Finals

Top half

Section 1

Section 2

Bottom half

Section 3

Section 4

References
 

Girls' Singles
Australian Open, 1999 Girls' Singles